Sarcochlamys is a monotypic genus of flowering plants belonging to the family Urticaceae. The only species is Sarcochlamys pulcherrima. It is a dioecious, evergreen shrub or small tree.

Its native range is Eastern Himalaya to Southern Central China and Northern Indo-China.

References

Urticaceae
Urticaceae genera
Monotypic Rosales genera
Dioecious plants